Nicholson is an unincorporated community and census-designated place (CDP) in Pearl River County, Mississippi, United States. As of the 2020 census, its population was 2,833. Its ZIP code is 39463.

Demographics 

As of the 2020 United States census, there were 2,833 people, 1,265 households, and 764 families residing in the CDP.

Notes

Census-designated places in Pearl River County, Mississippi
Unincorporated communities in Mississippi
Census-designated places in Mississippi
Unincorporated communities in Pearl River County, Mississippi